Pterophorus monospilalis, the white plume moth,  is a moth of the family Pterophoridae. It is endemic to New Zealand and occurs throughout the country. It inhabits native forest, parks and domestic gardens. Larvae are active during the day, are slow moving, and feed exposed. They feed on Pseudopanax species as well as on Hedera helix, Meryta sinclairii, and Schefflera digitata. There are several broods in a year. Adult moths are on the wing from November until May and are attracted to light.

Taxonomy 

This species was first described by Francis Walker in 1864 and named Aciptilus monospilalis. In 1875 Cajetan von Felder and Alois Friedrich Rogenhofer, thinking they were describing a new species, named it Aciptilia patruelis. In 1885 Meyrick synonymised A. patruelis with A. monospilalis. In the same publication Meyrick, thinking he was describing a new species, also named this species as Aciptilia lycosema. Merick described both A. monospilalis and the newly named A. lycosema in greater detail in a later 1885 publication. In 1913 Meyrick placed both A. monospilalis and A. lycosema into the genus Alucita. This placement was followed by George Hudson in his 1928 book The butterflies and moths of New Zealand. In the same publication Hudson continued to treated A. lycosema as a separate species. In 1934 A. V. Chappell, while discussing the work Alfred Philpott had undertaken examining the genitalia of both A. monospilalis and A. lycosema, argued that the morphological similarities as well as the life histories of the two were sufficient to show that A. lycosema was a synonym of A. monospilalis. In 1988 John S. Dugdale synonymised the two varieties of the species Aciptilus furcatalis originally described by Walker in his 1864 publication into Pterophorus monospilalis. In 1993 Cees Gielis discussed this species under the name Pterophorus monospilalis but placed it in a list where the species were regarded as having an uncertain status. The male lectotype specimen, collected by D. Bolton in Auckland, is held at the Natural History Museum, London.

Description

Egg 
The egg of this species is elliptical shaped and coloured a very pale green with a faint honeycomb pattern on the flattened upper surface.

Larva 
The mature larva was described by Chappell as follows:

Pupa 
The pupa is described by Chappell as being 10 mm long and coloured a very pale green with whitish shades on the wings and ventral portions. There is a noticeable black dorsal mark frequently present on lower thorax. The pupa often has pinkish-mauve marks. There are numerous setae with those on dorsal and lateral surfaces coloured a golden-brown, while those on ventral surface are white.

Adult 
The wingspan of the adult moth is between 21–23 mm. The head, palpi, antennae, thorax, abdomen, and legs are white. The forewings are snow-white with a few brownish-ochreous scales, a blackish dot before the cleft and a minute one on the inner margin before the middle. The hindwings and cilia are snow-white.

This species has a form that has a brown streak on its forewing. This form can be confused with P. furcatalis but can be distinguished as the second plume is white where as with P. furcatalis that second plume is brown.

Distribution 
This species is endemic to New Zealand and can be found throughout the country. However it tends to be scarce in the northern parts of the North Island as well as in the southern parts of the South Island.

Habitat and hosts 

The species inhabits native forest as well as domestic gardens and parks. The larvae feed on young new tips of Pseudopanax species including Pseudopanax arboreus, Pseudopanax colensoi and Pseudopanax lessonii as well as on Hedera helix, Meryta sinclairii, and Schefflera digitata.

Life history and behaviour 
The larvae of this species are diurnal, slow moving, and feed exposed without external protection. When they pupate the cocoon-less pupa is attached to the host plant leaf via a thread of silk. There are several broods in year. Adults are on the wing from November to May. It has been hypothesised that some adults from the autumn brood hibernate through winter. However it is more likely that the species exists in pupa through winter. They are nocturnal and are attracted to light.

References

Moths described in 1864
monospilalis
Moths of New Zealand
Endemic fauna of New Zealand
Taxa named by Francis Walker (entomologist)
Endemic moths of New Zealand